Saint-Philbert-de-Grand-Lieu is a commune in the Loire-Atlantique department in western France.

It is about 400 km southwest of Paris, via Chartres, Le Mans, Angers, and Nantes. The town is twinned with the Welsh suburb of Radyr in Cardiff, Wales's Capital.

Population

Related persons

Vicomte Bertrand Jochaud du Plessix, a lieutenant in the Free French Forces, reposes in the local cemetery. He died along with three comrades on 30 June 1940 when they were shot down by the Spanish while attempting to land their aircraft in Gibraltar. He was first buried at Gibraltar, and was reinterred in Saint-Philbert-de-Grand-Lieu. He was awarded Compagnon de la Libération posthumously in May 1941.

His daughter is the American writer Francine du Plessix Gray.

See also
Communes of the Loire-Atlantique department

References

Saintphilbertdegrandlieu